The following is a list of all team-to-team transactions that have occurred in the National Hockey League during the 1977–78 NHL season. It lists what team each player has been traded to, signed by, or claimed by, and for which player(s) or draft pick(s), if applicable.

Trades between teams

May

June 

 Trade completed on November 3, 1977.

August

 Trade completed on June 15, 1978, at the 1978 NHL Amateur Draft.

September

October

November 

 Trade completed on May 27, 1978.
 Trade completed on December 15, 1977.

December

January 

 Draft pick not exercised by Cleveland due to Barons-North Stars merger on June 14, one day prior to the 1978 NHL Amateur Draft.
 Draft pick forfeited by the Islanders due to Barons-North Stars merger on June 14, one day prior to the 1978 NHL Amateur Draft.

February

March 

 Trade completed on May 4, 1978.

Additional sources
 hockeydb.com - search for player and select "show trades"
 

National Hockey League transactions
1977–78 NHL season